Tourism is the most important nongovernment sector of Seychelles' economy. About 15 percent of the formal work force is directly employed in tourism, and employment in construction, banking, transportation, and other activities is closely tied to the tourist industry. Tourists enjoy the Seychelles' coral beaches and opportunities for water sports. Wildlife in the archipelago is also a major attraction.

History
The tourist industry was born with the completion of the Seychelles International Airport in 1971, advancing rapidly to a level of 77,400 arrivals in 1979. After slackening in the early 1980, growth was restored through the introduction of casinos, vigorous advertising campaigns, and more competitive pricing. After a decline to 90,050 in 1991 because of the Persian Gulf War, the number of visitors rose to more than 116,000 in 1993. In 1991 France was the leading source of tourists, followed by the United Kingdom, Germany, Italy, and South Africa. Europe provided 80 percent of the total tourists and Africa—mostly South Africa and Réunion—most of the remainder. European tourists are considered the most lucrative in terms of length of stay and per capita spending. 

Under the 1990-94 development plan, which emphasizes that the growth of tourism should not be at the expense of the environment, the number of beds on the islands of Mahé, Praslin, and La Digue is to be limited to 4,000. Increases in total capacity are to be achieved by developing the outer islands. To avoid future threat to the natural attractions of the islands, 150,000 tourists per year are regarded as the ultimate ceiling. The higher cost of accommodations and travel, deficiencies in services and maintenance of facilities, and a limited range of diversions handicap Seychelles in attracting vacationers at the expense of other Indian Ocean tourist destinations.

Statistics
The direct contribution of the tourism sector to GDP was estimated at 50 percent, and it provides about 70 percent of total foreign exchange earnings. Although difficult to measure, the import content of tourism expenditures is high, so net tourism earnings are significantly lower. 130,046 tourist arrivals were recorded in 2000, including over 104,000 from Europe. In the same year, Seychelles had 2,479 hotel rooms with 5,010 beds filled to 52% capacity. Tourist income was US$112 million in 1999. In 2002, the US Department of State estimated the average daily cost of staying in Seychelles at $246 per day.
According to the National Bureau of Statistics, 230,272 tourists visited Seychelles in 2013 compared to 208,034 in 2012.

Tourist attraction sites 

 Anse Intendance, Mahé
 Anse Lazio, Praslin
 Baie Lazare, Mahé
 La Digue Island
 Curieuse Island
Morne Seychellois National Park
Ste Anne National Marine Park
Beau Vallon Beach
Anse Volbert
Vallée de Mai National Park, Praslin
Cousin Island
Aride Island Nature Reserve
Silhouette Island
Victoria, Mahé
Bird Island
Aldabra Atoll 
Anse Royal, Mahé
Anse Cachee, Mahé
Takamaka Bay Beach

See also
Visa policy of Seychelles
Culture of Seychelles

References

 
Seychelles